Morris Munene Gachaga (born 7 April 1995) is a Kenyan long-distance runner. He competed in the men's race at the 2020 World Athletics Half Marathon Championships held in Gdynia, Poland.

In 2019, he competed in the men's half marathon at the African Games held in Rabat, Morocco.

References

External links 
 

Living people
1995 births
Place of birth missing (living people)
Kenyan male long-distance runners
Kenyan male marathon runners
Athletes (track and field) at the 2019 African Games
African Games competitors for Kenya
21st-century Kenyan people